Matthew Murphy (born 1984) is an English musician.

Matthew Murphy may also refer to:

Music
Matt "Guitar" Murphy (1929–2018), American blues guitarist
Matt Murphy (Canadian musician), Canadian musician and actor

Politics
Matthew Murphy (diplomat) (1890–1967), Irish ambassador to Argentina
Matt Murphy (politician) (born 1970), Illinois state senator

Sports
Matt Murphy (English footballer) (born 1971), English association football player
Matt Murphy (American football tackle) (born 1980), American football player
Matt Murphy (American football guard) (born 1989), American football guard
Matt Murphy (wrestler) (born 1979), retired American professional wrestler
Mattie Murphy, Irish hurling player